Akasaka Dam is a rockfill dam located in Saga Prefecture in Japan. The dam is used for agriculture. The catchment area of the dam is 0.4 km2. The dam impounds about 19  ha of land when full and can store 1460 thousand cubic meters of water. The construction of the dam was started on 1972 and completed in 1992.

References

Dams in Saga Prefecture
1992 establishments in Japan